Kristen Lepionka is an American author known for her crime mystery novel Roxane Weary Series. Lepionka's debut novel The Last Place You Look won Shamus award and was nominated for Bisexual Book Awards and Macavity Awards.

Career
Lepionka made her debut in the crime fiction with the novel The Last Place You Look in 2017. Lepionka's work has been praised for its unsentimental portrayal of a woman's struggle with alcoholism and her unapologetic portrayal of a bisexual character. The book won the Shamus Award for Best First P.I. Novel and was nominated for the Anthony and Macavity Awards.

Lepionka's second novel, "What You Want to See" in Roxane Weary Series was published in 2018, nominated for Bisexual Book awards ,and it was followed by The Stories You Tell in 2019  and Once You Go This Far in 2020.

Bibliography

References

American women writers
Shamus Award winners
Year of birth missing (living people)